Bernard Chenot (20 May 1909, in Paris – 5 June 1995) was a French politician and senior official.

Life
Bernard Chenot was the son of a Parisian barrister. He became  a member of the Conseil d'Etat during the Third Republic, and worked in several government departments. He remained in his position under the Vichy government after 1940. Under the Fourth Republic he was director of the coal-fields of northern France  for a while, and  an official adviser to successive governments on economic matters.

He served under Charles de Gaulle as Minister of Health, and then, until 1962, as Minister of Justice. When Georges Pompidou became prime minister, Chenot replaced him on the Constitutional Council for two years. He then went into business for some time, returning to public service in 1971 as  the vice-president of the Conseil d'Etat, retiring in 1978.

He  also lectured at the Institut d'Etudes Politiques and wrote a number of books about politics; his publications included  Etre ministre (1967), L'Hopital en question (1970) and Reflexions sur la cite (1981).

References

1909 births
1995 deaths
Politicians from Paris
Government ministers of France
French Ministers of Justice
Politicians of the French Fifth Republic
French people of the Algerian War